Qin'an railway station is a railway station of Baoji–Lanzhou High-Speed Railway, Gansu, China.

Stations on the Xuzhou–Lanzhou High-Speed Railway
Railway stations in Gansu